The Willem Lodewijk Gymnasium is a Christian gymnasium (secondary school) in Groningen, Netherlands. It is the smaller of two non-comprehensive gymnasiums in Groningen, along with Praedinius Gymnasium. As of 2015, the gymnasium had approximately 710 students and 78 staff members.

History 
On March 11,1909, a group of parents founded the school. It was named the Willem Lodewijk Gymnasium after Count William Louis of Nassau-Dillenburg.

Academic results
An average of 71% of all students pass the Dutch final exams without repeating a class. The average mark for the final exams is 6.8 out of 10.

Facilities 
The gymnasium was originally located at 46 Oosterstraat. In 1923, it was relocated to 11 Oosterstraat as enrollment increased. In 1969, the school relocated to 220 Verzetstrijderslaan.

References 

Gymnasiums in the Netherlands
Schools in Groningen